Gaydari Peak is the ice-covered peak rising to 852 m on the coast of Darbel Bay on Loubet Coast in Graham Land, Antarctica.  It surmounts Darbel Bay to the west and its part Tlachene Cove to the south, and Hopkins Glacier to the southeast.

The peak is named after the settlement of Gaydari in the Northern Bulgaria.

Location
British mapping in 1976.

Maps
 Antarctic Digital Database (ADD). Scale 1:250000 topographic map of Antarctica. Scientific Committee on Antarctic Research (SCAR). Since 1993, regularly upgraded and updated.
British Antarctic Territory. Scale 1:200000 topographic map. DOS 610 Series, Sheet W 66 64. Directorate of Overseas Surveys, Tolworth, UK, 1976.

Notes

References
 Bulgarian Antarctic Gazetteer. Antarctic Place-names Commission. (details in Bulgarian, basic data in English)
Gaydari Peak. SCAR Composite Antarctic Gazetteer.

External links
 Gaydari Peak. Copernix satellite image

Mountains of Graham Land
Bulgaria and the Antarctic
Loubet Coast